Ivan Kondakov (1857–1931) was a chemist of Russian heritage working in Estonia, who, as professor of pharmacology of University of Tartu, studied polymerisation and invented synthetic rubber in 1901.

Sources 
 Estonica: The sciences in Tartu in the 19th century
 Postimees 23 May 2009: Eesti kõige edukamad leiutised

1857 births
1931 deaths
Estonian chemists
Russian chemists
Academic staff of the University of Tartu
Estonian people of Russian descent